Mark Jordan or Marc Jordan may refer to:

Marc Jordan (born 1947), American-born Canadian musician and actor
Mark Jordan (Shortland Street), Shortland Street characters
Mark D. Jordan, professor of Christian Thought at Harvard Divinity School 
Mark Jordan Legan, American television producer
C. Mark Jordan, American automobile designer
DJ Pooh (Mark Jordan, born 1966), American record producer rapper
Mark Jordan, Canadian songwriter, lead singer of The Edison Electric Band in the 1970s
Mark Jordan, American land developer and convicted criminal, husband of Laura Maczka Jordan

See also
 Mark Jordon (born 1965), English actor